The Sun 2000 is a French trailerable sailboat that was designed by Olivier Petit as a cruiser and first built in 2000.

Production
The design was built by Jeanneau in France, starting in 1999 and ending in 2010, with 1,470 boats built.

Design
The Sun 2000 is a recreational sailboat, built predominantly of polyester fiberglass. The hull is made from solid fiberglass, while the deck is an injection molded fiberglass sandwich. It has a 9/10 fractional sloop rig, with a deck-stepped mast, a single set of swept spreaders and aluminum spars with stainless steel wire  rigging. The hull has a plumb stem and transom, a transom-hung rudder controlled by a tiller and a retractable centerboard. It displaces  and carries  of ballast.

The boat is normally fitted with a small  outboard motor for docking and maneuvering.

The design has sleeping accommodation for four people, with a double "V"-berth in the bow and two straight settees in the main cabin around an oval table. The galley is located on both sides, amidships and is equipped with a small sink and has space for a portable stove.

The design has a hull speed of

See also
List of sailing boat types

References

External links

Video: Jeanneau Sun 2000 yacht launch and sailing
Video Tour of a Jeanneau Sun 2000 trailer sailer

1990s sailboat type designs
Sailing yachts
Trailer sailers
Sailboat type designs by Olivier Petit
Sailboat types built by Jeanneau